The Graben Tour is a mining history footpath in the north of the former district of Freiberg in the German Free State of Saxony.  It follows the course of an old mining water channel, in the valley of the Bobritzsch, from Krummenhennersdorf to Reinsberg.

History 
The name of the walk is derived from the artificial water channel or Kunstgraben that was laid here between 1844 and 1847 to supply water for the mining industry, Graben being German for "ditch". The channel was used to make water available for overshot wheels (Kunsträder) and reversible wheels (Kehrräder) at the 4th Shaft (IV. Lichtloch) and the two Schwamkrug turbines at the 5th Shaft (V. Lichtloch), which were used to transport the rock extracted from the Rothschönberger Stolln mine and for water management.

Literature

References

External links 

 IV Shaft Society (Verein IV. Lichtloch)
 The Graben Tour

Hiking trails in Germany
Culture of Saxony
Ore Mountains
Freiberg
Mining in the Ore Mountains
Protected landscapes in Germany
Kunstgraben
History of mining in Germany